Bonnetina is a genus of Mexican tarantulas that was first described by F. Vol in 2000.

Morphology 
Before the era of genetics and molecular phylogeny, tarantulas were classified based on the presence or absence of physical traits and characteristics. However, tarantulas happen to be excessively homoplastic, meaning the same seemingly unique characteristics have evolved separately rather than from a common ancestor, leading to many misplacements and misidentifications, and this genus is no different. 

In 2018, a molecular study and phylogenetic analysis by Ortiz, Francke, and Bond aimed to create a timeline in the evolution of Bonnetina and to address possible monophyly in the genus. They sampled DNA from select taxa, sequencing five nuclear markers and one mitochondrial marker, concluding that Bonnetina was composed of unrelated species that simply shared physical attributes, with the exception of B. juxtantricola. Only the sexual features were observed not to be homoplastic, suggesting that sexual selection may have been a driving force in their divergence.

Species
 it contains sixteen species, all found in Mexico:
Bonnetina alagoni Locht & Medina, 2008 – Mexico
Bonnetina aviae Estrada-Alvarez & Locht, 2011 – Mexico
Bonnetina cyaneifemur Vol, 2000 (type) – Mexico
Bonnetina flammigera Ortiz & Francke, 2017 – Mexico
Bonnetina hijmenseni Ortiz & Francke, 2017 – Mexico
Bonnetina hobbit Ortiz & Francke, 2017 – Mexico
Bonnetina julesvernei Ortiz & Francke, 2017 – Mexico
Bonnetina malinalli Ortiz & Francke, 2017 – Mexico
Bonnetina megagyna Ortiz & Francke, 2017 – Mexico
Bonnetina minax Ortiz & Francke, 2017 – Mexico
Bonnetina papalutlensis Mendoza, 2012 – Mexico
Bonnetina tanzeri Schmidt, 2012 – Mexico
Bonnetina tenuiverpis Ortiz & Francke, 2015 – Mexico
Bonnetina tindoo Ortiz & Francke, 2017 – Mexicoa
Bonnetina unam Ortiz & Francke, 2017 – Mexico
Bonnetina vittata Ortiz & Francke, 2017 – Mexico

In synonymy:
B. reyescastilloi Estrada-Alvarez, 2014 = Bonnetina tanzeri Schmidt, 2012

See also
 List of Theraphosidae species

References

Theraphosidae genera
Spiders of Mexico
Theraphosidae